This is a list of rural localities in the Jewish Autonomous Oblast. Its administrative center is the town of Birobidzhan. Article 65 of the Constitution of Russia provides that the JAO is Russia's only autonomous oblast.

Birobidzhansky District 
Rural localities in Birobidzhansky District:

 Birofeld
 Nayfeld
 Valdgeym

Leninsky District 
Rural localities in Leninsky District:

 Babstovo
 Leninskoye
 Nizhneleninskoye
 Novoye

Obluchensky District 
Rural localities in Obluchensky District:

 Abramovka

Oktyabrsky District 
Rural localities in Oktyabrsky District:

 Amurzet
 Blagoslovennoye

Smidovichsky District 
Rural localities in Smidovichsky District:

 Danilovka
 Volochayevka-1

See also
 
 Lists of rural localities in Russia

References

Jewish Autonomous Oblast